Vorona or Varona is a surname of East Slavic origin, meaning "crow". It may refer to:

 Dmytro Vorona (born 1980), Ukrainian politician
 Ekaterina Vorona (born 1975), Russian artist
 Larysa Varona (born 1983), Belarusian cross-country skier
 Mariya Vorona (born 1983), Belarusian rower
 Nikita Vorona (born 1995), Russian footballer
 Valery Vorona, Russian violinist
 Yana Vorona (born 2004), Russian gymnast
 Yelena Vorona (born 1976), Russian freestyle skier

See also
 
 Wrona

Russian-language surnames
Ukrainian-language surnames